WKNX-LD is a low-power television station in Pinconning, Michigan. Its calls were chosen by P&P Cable Holdings after WEYI in Flint had switched its callsign from WKNX to WEYI.

External links

KNX-LD
Television channels and stations established in 2003
2003 establishments in Michigan
Low-power television stations in the United States